Allaste (Alsten in German) is a village in Mulgi Parish in Viljandi County in southern Estonia. It borders the villages Pärsi, Polli, Leeli and Pöögle as well as other villages in the former Halliste Parish.

References

Villages in Viljandi County